Guignolet is a French wild cherry liqueur.

It is widely available in France, including at supermarkets such as Casino and others, but is not widely available internationally.

A leading producer is the company Giffard in Angers, France, the same town where Cointreau is produced. The Cointreau brothers were instrumental in its reinvention, the original recipe having been lost.

Composition and etymology
It obtains its name from guigne, one of a few species of cherry used in its production. (Black cherries and sour cherries are also used.) It has an alcohol content between 16 and 18° proof (ca. 12%) and has an aroma vaguely reminiscent of whiskey and a very sweet taste.

Uses
It is drunk neat as an aperitif.

The cocktail guignolo is composed of guignolet, champagne and cherry juice.

References
French Wikipedia:Guignolet

Jules Romains mentions the liqueur in his novel "Les Copains" (Éditions Gallimard,1922). The innkeeper responds to Broudier et Bénin: "Je n'ai justement plus de fine, mes bons messieurs; mais j'ai encore du guignolet.
In Fred Varga's thriller An Uncertain Place, two of the characters share a guignolet every night, accompanied by winkles picked out by each with his personal pin, one with a blue head, one with an orange head.

Audric Baillard, a key recurring character in Kate Mosse' Languedoc trilogy of books (Labyrinth,Sepulchre and Citadel) is especially fond of Guignolet.

Cherry liqueurs and spirits
French liqueurs